Gloucester Park in Basildon is an urban neighbourhood park, named after the Duke of Gloucester, who opened the park in 1957. In the 1970s a  artificial fishing lake was made in the park. Since 2001 it has held the annual Basildon Festival, which moved from Wat Tyler park. It is also the training facility of Basildon Amateur Athletics Club who boast an all-weather stadium and train mostly on a Monday and Wednesday night.
Other facilities at the park include a swimming pool, netball and tennis courts, bowling green, children's playground, cricket and football pitches with astro turf.

A sporting complex was built on the northern edge of the Park, initially serving as a training camp for the Olympic Games in London 2012.

The park is frequently used for cross country events throughout the year.

External links
Images of the Park
Basildon Sporting Village
Plans for Sporting Village

Parks and open spaces in Essex
Borough of Basildon